Francesco Albotto (1721–1757) was an Italian painter from Venice, mainly producing vedute. He was a pupil of Michele Marieschi. After Marieschi's death, Albotto married his widow and took over his shop, and continued to produce paintings in a similar style until his own death, which has led to some problems in attributing paintings to Marieschi versus Albotto.

Works 
 Veduta del Molo e del Bacino di San Marco, Sotheby's, New York, 
 San Giuseppe di Castello (1745), oil canvas, private collection
 Campo Santi Giovanni 
 Molo San Marco 
 Capriccio con obelisco, oil canvas, Galleria Lorenzelli, Bergame,
 Capriccio con obelisco e arco gotico, oil canvas, Gallerie dell'Accademia, Venise,
 Campo dei Santi Giovanni e Paolo, oil canvas, Gallerie dell'Accademia, Venise,
 View of grand canal with the Santa Maria della Salute church, oil canvas,
 View of the camp and doors of the Arsenal (1743–1746),
View of the Piazzetta, with the Palazzo Ducale and the Biblioteca Marciana, Westbury Fine Art ltd, oil on canvas

Bibliography 
 R. Toledano, Michele Marieschi: l'opera completa, Milan, 1988,
 Dario Succi, Marieschi: tra Canaletto e Guardi, catalogue, Turin, 1989, 
 M. Manzelli, Michele Marieschi e il suo alter-ego Francesco Albotto, Venise, 1991, 
 Domenico Sedini, Francesco Albotto, online catalogue Artgate of the Fondazione Cariplo, 2010, CC-BY-SA.
 Miklós Boskovits, Giorgio FossaluzzaLa collezione Cagnola. I dipinti, editor: Nomos Edizioni, Busto Arsizio, 1998.

References

Other projects

1721 births
1757 deaths
18th-century Italian painters
Italian male painters
Painters from Venice
Italian vedutisti
18th-century Italian male artists